Michael Cho is a Canadian illustrator and cartoonist. He has been nominated for a number of awards and his work has been positively reviewed.

Early life
Cho was born in South Korea but immigrated to Canada at the age of 6. He has said "In some ways I learned to read English by reading comic books. And of course, I copied all the drawings."

Career
Cho's artwork appears in a number of different genres. He has painted book covers for Random House/Knopf and Penguin Books. His cover for White Noise has been called a "remarkable" design that "masterfully captures" aspects of the novel. He is the creator of the webcomic Papercut, has done illustrations for The New York Times Book Review, and has created comics work for Taddle Creek literary magazine.

His work retains classic comic book aspects and "evokes the pop art of Roy Lichtenstein and aesthetics of Silver and Bronze age superhero comics in equal measure." He has provided cover art for several DC Comics reprint collections and drew the 1940s variant cover for Action Comics #1000 (June 2018).

On September 2, 2014, Cho published his first graphic novel, Shoplifter.  Each illustration is done in two-colors. He states that he likes two-tone work because it allows him to focus on the mood and atmosphere.  To paint the tones, he used colored inks, and the rest was done with brushes, pens, and brush pens.

Joe Biden's presidential campaign commissioned Michael Cho to design three comic images. The images were posted on their social medias.

Awards and nominations
 Silver Medal for "Stars" at the 2007 National Magazine Awards
 Honourable Mention for "Night Time" in the Words and Pictures category of the 2004 National Magazine Awards
 Papercut was nominated for a Joe Shuster Award in the webcomics category.
 A story included in The Best American Comics 2010
 Won a Joe Shuster Award in the cover artist category

References

External links
 
 
 Michael Cho at Mike's Amazing World of Comics
 Michael Cho at the Unofficial Handbook of Marvel Comics Creators
 Michael Cho Represented by Gerald and Cullen Rapp

Canadian comics artists
Canadian graphic designers
Canadian illustrators
Canadian people of Korean descent
Joe Shuster Award winners
Living people
South Korean emigrants to Canada
Year of birth missing (living people)